P. R. Ramaiya (1894–1970) was the founder of Tainadu, the premier Kannada Newspaper of the Indian state of Mysore during the freedom movement.  He was also an editor at the Daily News, an evening newspaper in Bangalore.

Born in Sreerangapatna in 1894 Ramaiya went to Benares to study and completed his B.Sc in 1919 and studied for his M.Sc in Chemistry but did not take the final exam.
Ramaiya met Gandhi in Benares when he was a student and became involved in Gandhis Quit India movement. In September 1942, Ramaiya was arrested and his newspaper, Tainadu, was suspended. Ramaiya was one of the first members of the Indian National Congress in Mysore. He was elected to the MLA seat from Basavanagudi from the Congress party in their first general election in 1952. He held the position of MLA from 1952-1957.
He was ably assisted by his wife in all ventures. Mrs. P.R.Jayalakshamma, his wife was a social worker, and was the deputy mayor of Bangalore. He is related to eminent educationist Professor V. T. Srinivasan, one of the founders and Principal of Vijaya college, Bangalore. Smt. V. T. Bhuvaneswari, who was the head of Physics Department, daughter of Professor V. T. Srinivasan, was one of the daughters-in-law of Mr. P. R. Ramiah.

References

1894 births
1970 deaths
Businesspeople from Mysore
Kannada people
Mysore MLAs 1952–1957